Meillant is a commune in the Cher department in the Centre-Val de Loire region of France.

Geography

Population

Sights
 The church of St. Aubin, dating from the sixteenth century.
 The thirteenth-century château de Meillant, once the home of the house of Amboise.
 Several houses dating from the sixteenth century.
 A seventeenth-century washhouse at the hamlet of Saint-Rhamble.
 Traces of a 17th-century priory.
 The sixteenth-century chapel at the chateau.
 Some parts of the convent of Saint Catherine.
 A museum at the chateau.

See also
Communes of the Cher department

References

Communes of Cher (department)